Officers' Competency Certificates Convention, 1936 is  an International Labour Organization Convention.

It was established in 1936, with the preamble stating:

Having decided upon the adoption of certain proposals with regard to the establishment by each maritime country of a minimum requirement of professional capacity in the case of captain, navigating and engineer officers in charge of watches on board merchant ships, ...

Ratifications
As of January 2023, the convention has been ratified by 37 states. It has subsequently been denounced by 26 of the ratifying states.

External links 
Text.
Ratifications.

International Labour Organization conventions
Treaties concluded in 1936
Treaties entered into force in 1939
Treaties of Argentina
Treaties of Belgium
Treaties of Bosnia and Herzegovina
Treaties of Vargas-era Brazil
Treaties of Cuba
Treaties of Djibouti
Treaties of the Kingdom of Egypt
Treaties of Estonia
Treaties of West Germany
Treaties of Ireland
Treaties of Israel
Treaties of South Korea
Treaties of the Libyan Arab Republic
Treaties of Mauritania
Treaties of Mexico
Treaties of Montenegro
Treaties of New Zealand
Treaties of Panama
Treaties of Peru
Treaties of Slovenia
Treaties of the United Arab Republic
Treaties of Turkey
Treaties of the United States
Treaties of Yugoslavia
Treaties of North Macedonia
Admiralty law treaties
Treaties extended to American Samoa
Treaties extended to Puerto Rico
Treaties extended to the United States Virgin Islands
Treaties extended to Guam
Treaties extended to the French Southern and Antarctic Lands
1936 in labor relations